Jianjun may refer to:

Cui Jianjun (born 1985), male Chinese volleyball player
Jianjun Dong (born 1988), Chinese heavyweight professional boxer (ring name Taishan Dong)
He Jianjun (born 1960), Chinese film director and screenwriter
Li Jianjun (born 1977), investigative journalist in the People's Republic of China
Liu Jianjun (born 1969), male Chinese badminton player
Lü Jianjun, Chinese football player
Ma Jianjun (born 1984), male Chinese water polo player
Mei Jianjun (梅建军), archaeo-metallurgist
Jianjun Shi (born 1963), Chinese-born American engineer and professor
Wang Jianjun (born 1958), Chinese provincial politician, CPC Secretary of Qinghai Province
Wei Jianjun (born 1964), Chinese businessman, chairman of Great Wall Motors, the largest Chinese SUV manufacturer
Jianjun Xu (born 1995), Chinese footballer
Zhu Jianjun (1447–1487),  Chenghua Emperor, was the ninth Emperor of the Ming dynasty, who reigned from 1464 to 1487

See also
Jiajun
Jiangjun (disambiguation)
Jin Jian
Junjun (disambiguation)